Robert Carroll may refer to:

Bobby Carroll (Robert Carroll, 1938–2016), Scottish footballer
Robert L. Carroll (1938–2020), American paleontologist
Robert Todd Carroll (1945–2016), American academic and well-known skeptic of pseudoscience
Robert Carroll (Australian politician) (1876–1940), member of the Queensland Legislative Council
Robert Carroll (American politician), member of the New York State Assembly
Robert Carroll (actor) (1918–1994), TV actor who starred in the 1954 series The Stranger
Robert Carroll (boxer), amateur boxing flyweight champion in 1938, see National Amateur Flyweight Champions

See also
Bob Carroll (disambiguation)